Rudenia is a genus of moths belonging to the family Tortricidae.

Species
Rudenia immanis Razowski, 1994
Rudenia leguminana (Busck, 1907)
Rudenia nigrans Razowski, 1985
Rudenia paupercula Razowski, 1985
Rudenia sepulturae Razowski & Becker, 2007

See also
List of Tortricidae genera

References

 , 2005: World Catalogue of Insects volume 5 Tortricidae.
 , 1985, Polskie Pismo Ent. 55: 55
 , 2011: Diagnoses and remarks on genera of Tortricidae, 2: Cochylini (Lepidoptera: Tortricidae). SHILAP Revista de Lepidopterología 39 (156): 397–414.

External links
Tortricid.net

Cochylini
Tortricidae genera